Asteroid Pirates is a 1980 board game published by Yaquinto Publications.

Gameplay
Asteroid Pirates is a game in which tactical ship-to-ship space combat between players takes place inside the asteroid belt.

Reception
Earl Perkins reviewed Asteroid Pirates in The Space Gamer No. 53. Perkins commented that "In conclusion, Asteroid Pirates is a fine game for those who: a) like good, simple (and repairable) combat mechanics; b) like to correct and expand vague rules; and c) have always wondered what chess with death was like."

References

Board games introduced in 1980
Yaquinto Publications games